River Suite for Two Guitars is a collaboration album of guitarists Tony Rice and John Carlini, who both previously performed with the David Grisman Quintet.

Track listing 
 "Banister River" (John Carlini, Tony Rice) 2:25
 "Send in the Clowns" (Stephen Sondheim) 3:06
 "Innocenti" (Ralph Towner) 3:56
 "So It Goes" (Carlini) 3:36
 "Nardis" (Miles Davis) 3:36
 "Unknown Emotion/Hidden Place" (Matt Maher) 3:34
 "Fish Scale" (Artie Traum) 2:36
 "Night Coach" (Rice) 2:32
 "Big Mang" (Carlini) 1:52
 "Summertime" (George Gershwin, DuBose Heyward) 4:10
 "It Takes a Thief" (Dave Grusin) 3.05
 "Devlin" (Rice) 4:46

Personnel
 Tony Rice - guitar
 John Carlini - guitar

References

1995 albums
Sugar Hill Records albums